The latest population estimate for the City of Sheffield is  residents. This represents an increase of about 17,000 people since the last census in 2011.

In the 21st century the city has undergone a population growth above that of the national average, and is projected to increase to over 600,000 by 2020. This can largely be attributed to immigration and relatively high birth rates.

Population
People from Sheffield (or 'Sheffielders') are colloquially known to residents of the surrounding towns of Barnsley, Doncaster, Rotherham and Chesterfield as "dee-dars", which derives from the traditional pronunciation of the "th" in the dialectal words "thee" and "thou", still used, especially by older people, in South Yorkshire. Many Yorkshire dialect words and aspects of pronunciation derive from old Norse due to the Viking influence in this region.

As with many British cities, the major period of growth in Sheffield's population occurred during the industrial revolution, when the city attracted large numbers of people looking for work in the local industries (particularly the cutlery and steel industries). In 1801 the population of the Parish of Sheffield was 45,755, by 1891 the population of the soon-to-be City of Sheffield (which covered the same area) was 325,547. Through most of the 20th century, despite the decline in manufacturing jobs from the 1970s onwards, the population remained relatively stable at about 515,000. This was due in part to the efforts made by the city to bring in white collar jobs.

Ethnicity

The following table shows the ethnic group of respondents in the 2001 and 2011 censuses in Sheffield.

Notes for table above

By far the largest ethnic group in Sheffield is what the 2011 census classified as White British—white people of British ancestry, who make up about 81% of the city's population, an 8% drop from 2001. The remaining percentage of city's population includes a diverse range of ethnic backgrounds. Between the 1991 and 2001 census the minority ethnic population in Sheffield grew by more than 80%.

South Asians 

The South Asian ethnic group which is people of Indian, Pakistani and Bangladeshi origin is the second largest ethnic group in the city comprising 32,400 people, with Pakistanis forming the largest group at 16,800 people.  The community is mainly centred in the Sharrow, Burngreave, Darnall and Attercliffe areas where there are many mosques, temples, community centres, Bollywood cinemas and Asian clothes and food stores.  The Sheffield South Asian community has a large influence on the city with a number of Asian politicians making up members of Sheffield City Council.  There are several large multi-cultural festivals throughout the year, as well as many Asian markets and restaurants scattered around the city.

Somalis and Ethiopians

The Sheffield Somali community is the second largest and one of the oldest in the United Kingdom, with the first Somalis having arrived in Britain during the interwar period and more arriving, particularly to work in the city's steel industry, between the 1940s and 1960s. Most of the current population however have settled in Sheffield since the 1980s due to unrest and drought in their homeland. According to the Department for Communities and Local Government, estimates of the Somali community made between 2003 and 2007 ranged from 3,000 to 5,000. Based on data from the Information Centre about Asylum and Refugees, the International Organization for Migration gave an estimate of 10,000 in 2006. The number of people living Sheffield who were born in Somalia recorded by the 2011 UK Census was 2,372. According to community leaders, there were around 1,500 Ethiopians living in Sheffield in 2006.

Black Caribbeans

The Black Caribbean population in Sheffield is one of the largest in England with 9,100 people claiming Black Caribbean ancestry. There are no specific concentration of people in specific areas, although large communities do exist in Sharrow, Burngreave and Netherthorpe.  Also in these areas are many Afro Caribbean restaurants, hair stylists, food stores and community centres the most notable being SADACCA located on The Wicker.  Famous Afro Caribbean Sheffielders include: Steve Edwards, Jessica Ennis, Johnny Nelson, Oona King.

Black Africans

Black Africans are one of the newest and fastest growing ethnic groups in the city, with the majority being immigrants from war-torn or politically unstable countries.  Most Black Africans tend to use Afro-Caribbean stores and community centres instead of starting up their own centres and stores. The majority of Black Africans live in Burngreave and are mainly from Zimbabwe, Kenya, Nigeria, the Democratic Republic of Congo, Burundi and Liberia. The number of Black Africans living in Sheffield in 2006 was 8,300.

East Europeans

There has been a large East European Community in Sheffield since the 1940s, when many Polish citizens settled in the city instead of returning to their homeland. A Polish Consulate was opened in Sheffield in 1997 in honour of this. The Sheffield East European community has grown substantially since 2004 when several East European countries joined the E.U with the main settlers being from Poland, Latvia and Slovakia. In July 2006 the Home Office gave Sheffield City Council extra funds to look after and house its large new immigrant East European communities.
An interesting fact is that the Polish community in Sheffield despite the fact of its small size has own independent internet newspaper Sheffield24.pl which is active non-stop from 2011.

Chinese

The Chinese community is one of the smallest but fastest growing ethnic groups in Sheffield with only 5,900 permanent residents in 2006. The community is significantly larger during term time as many overseas students from China, Malaysia and Singapore study at Sheffield's two universities creating a large non-resident community. London Road in Sharrow is recognized as Sheffield's unofficial Chinatown due to its high concentration of restaurants, supermarkets and other stores. The Sheffield Chinese Community Centre is also based here.

Spanish

Sheffield has one of the largest Spanish-descended populations in the country, with over 3,000 Sheffielders of Spanish ancestry. Most origins in the city are from migration in the 20th century.

Other Groups

Other ethnic groups of Sheffield include Iranians, Kurds, Kosovars and British Yemeni who have made Sheffield their home over the years. The Kurds and Kosovars have moved to Sheffield in large numbers over the last ten years, many illegally or as Asylum seekers so the exact number of people of these groups living in the city is unknown. There are an estimated 3,500 - 9,000 Yemenis in Sheffield which is makes it one of the largest community in the UK. Many Yemenis emigrated to Sheffield since 1950. Other small ethnic groups in Sheffield include around 300 people of Chilean ancestry and around 300 people from Vietnam.

Sheffield is one of the UK's major cities that is part of the Gateway Protection Programme that has seen around 120 people from Liberia and Burma settle in the city. According to BBC's Born Abroad Sheffield has large clusters of Malaysians and Iranians.

Ethnicity of school pupils

Languages

The most common main languages spoken in Sheffield according to the 2011 census are shown below.

Religion

The following table shows the religion of respondents in the 2001 and 2011 censuses in Sheffield.

See also

List of famous residents of Sheffield
Demography of the United Kingdom
Demography of England
Demography of London
Demography of Birmingham
Demography of Greater Manchester
List of English cities by population
List of English districts by population
List of English districts and their ethnic composition
List of English districts by area
List of English districts by population density

References

External links
Refugees in Sheffield
BBC Article

 
Sheffield
Sheffield